Gottfried John (29 August 1942 – 1 September 2014) was a German stage, screen,  and voice actor. A long-time collaborator of Rainer Werner Fassbinder, John appeared in nine of the filmmaker's projects between 1975 and 1981, the year before Fassbinder's death, including Eight Hours Don't Make a Day, Mother Küsters Goes to Heaven, Despair, The Marriage of Maria Braun, and Berlin Alexanderplatz. His distinctive, gaunt appearance saw him frequently cast as villains, and he is best known to audiences for his role as the corrupt General Arkady Ourumov in the 1995 James Bond film GoldenEye, and for his comedic turn as Julius Caesar in Asterix & Obelix Take On Caesar, the latter for which he won the Bavarian Film Award for Best Supporting Actor.

Early life
John was born in Berlin, Germany, on 29 August 1942. In World War II, he and his mother were evacuated to East Prussia; his father, whom he never met, was married to another woman. He grew up with his single-parent mother and in several protectories; John fled from such a protectory when he was 15 years old and returned to his mother, who was living in Paris.

In Paris, he earned a living as a pavement artist and construction worker, and he returned to Berlin in 1960.

Career
During the 1970s and early 1980s, John was cast by director Rainer Werner Fassbinder in several of his projects, in particular as Reinhold in the Berlin Alexanderplatz (1980) mini-series.

He was internationally known for his portrayal of General Arkady Ourumov in the James Bond film GoldenEye and Julius Caesar in Asterix and Obelix take on Caesar.

Personal life
Many years he lived in Kelmis, Belgium, near the Border to Aachen until 2008.
John lived with his wife, Brigitte, in Utting am Ammersee from 2008 until his death in 2014.

On 1 September 2014, it was announced that John had died in Utting am Ammersee near Munich, Germany, of cancer at the age of 72.

Works

Filmography

 Café Oriental (1962) (uncredited)
 Das Mädchen und der Staatsanwalt (1962), as Train passenger (uncredited) 
 Jaider, der einsame Jäger (1971), as Jaider
 Carlos (1971, TV Movie), as Carlos
 Eight Hours Don't Make a Day (1972–1973, TV Series), as Jochen
 World on a Wire (1973, TV Movie), as Einstein
 Mother Küsters' Trip to Heaven (1975), as Niemeyer
 Der Kommissar: Der Held des Tages (1976, TV series episode), as Werner Stimmel
 Derrick: Das Superding (1976, TV series episode), as Krummbach
 Und Rosa und Marilyn und ... (1977, TV Movie)
 The Stationmaster's Wife (1977, TV Movie), as Divorce lawyer
 Edwards Film (1977, TV Movie)
 Despair (1978), as Perebrodov
 Fedora (1978), as Kritos
 Marija (1978, TV Movie), as Filipp
 1982: Gutenbach (1978, TV Movie), as Peter Kessel
 In a Year of 13 Moons (1978), as Anton Saitz
 Die Ratten (1979, TV Movie), as Bruno Mechelke
 Wo die Liebe hinfällt (1979, anthology film, TV Movie)
 The Marriage of Maria Braun (1979), as Willi Klenze
  (1979, TV miniseries), as Clemens Koch
  (1979, TV miniseries), as Mr. Adam
 Reiseabrechnung (1980, TV Movie)
 Berlin Alexanderplatz (1980, TV miniseries), as Reinhold
 Lili Marleen (1981), as Aaron
 Ente oder Trente (1982)
  (1982, TV miniseries), as Loskutow
 Die Matrosen von Kronstadt (1983, TV Movie), as Petritschenko
 Super (1984), as Police Officer Hilpert
 Chinese Boxes (1984), as Zwemmer
 Bartolome oder Die Rückkehr der weißen Götter (1985, TV Movie), as Bartolomé de las Casas
 Mata Hari (1985), as Wolff
 Verworrene Bilanzen (1985, TV Movie), as Karl M. Kronen
 Ein Fall für zwei: Fluchtgeld (1985, TV series episode), as Hans Beckers
 Die Mitläufer (1985)
 Otto – Der Film (1985), as Sonnemann
 Die Schwärmer (1985, TV Movie), as Stader
 Das Gehirn zu Pferde (1986, TV Movie), as The Playwright
 Of Pure Blood (1986, TV Movie), as Paul Bergmann
 Franza (1987, TV Movie), as Captain
 The Winner Takes All (1987, TV Movie), as Ulrich Vogtmann
 Game, Set and Match (1988, TV series), as Eric Stinnes
 Schön war die Zeit (1988), as Franz Bauer
 Ein Fall für zwei: Seitensprung (1989, TV series episode), as Markus Meyer
 : Tödliches Wochenende (1990, TV series episode), as Mr. Mannheim
 Wings of Fame (1990), as Zlatogorski
 Drehort Pfarrhaus (1990, TV miniseries), as Pfarrer Achim Hollweg
 La piovra,  (1990, TV miniseries), as Friar Gillo
 Frederick Forsyth Presents: Death Has a Bad Reputation (1990, TV Movie), as Rodimstev
 Night of the Fox (1990, TV Movie), as Hofer
 Elfenbein (1991, TV Movie), as Nicholas Messier
 Ich schenk dir die Sterne (1991), as Robert Dallburg
 The Mistake (1992), as Jacob Alain
 Die Zeit danach (1992)
 Space Rangers (1993, TV Series, 6 episodes), as Colonel Erich Weiss
 Colpo di coda (1993, TV miniseries), as Pierre
  (1993), as Sophie's Father
  (1993, TV miniseries), as Collani
 Abraham (1993, TV miniseries), as Eliezer
 Polizeiruf 110: Arme Schweine (1994, TV Series episode), as Hannes Hellwig
 Beckmann und Markowski (1994–1999, TV Series, 3 episodes), as Beckmann
  (1995, TV Movie), as Alexander
 Die Falle (1995, TV Movie), as Hasso
 Wolffs Revier: Taekwon-Do (1995, TV Series episode), as Johnny Reschke
 Ein letzter Wille (1995, TV Movie), as Paul Elling
 Institute Benjamenta (1995), as Johannes Benjamenta
 Tatort: Der König kehrt zurück (1995, TV Series episode), as Harry Mucher
 GoldenEye (1995), as General Arkady Ourumov
 Brüder auf Leben und Tod (1996, TV Movie), as Renato Calvi
 The Ogre (1996), as Chief Forester
 La casa dove abitava Corinne (1996, TV Movie), as Michele Wolf
 Millennium: The Hand of St. Sebastian (1997, TV Series episode), as Josef Heim
 Tales of the South Seas: Paradise Regained (1998, TV Series episode), as Gunter
 Am I Beautiful? (1998), as Herbert
 Die Fremde in meiner Brust (1998, TV Movie), as Richard Keller
 Black Ice (1998, TV Movie), as Kurt Wallmann
 Asterix and Obelix vs. Caesar (1999), as Julius Caesar
  (1999, TV Movie), as Count Hanski
 Teuflischer Engel (2000, TV Movie), as Henry Martens
  (2000, TV Movie), as Herod Antipas
 Proof of Life (2000), as Eric Kessler
 Die Cleveren: Arzt und Dämon (2002, TV Series episode), as Dr. Brendel
 Der Solist: In eigener Sache (2002, TV Series episode), as Martin Krohn
 The Gathering Storm (2002, TV Movie), as Friedrich von Schroder
 Nancy & Frank – A Manhattan Love Story (2002), as Paul von Bernwarth
 Entrusted (2003, TV Movie), as Thomas von Gall
 Imperium: Augustus (2003, TV Movie), as Cicero
  (2003), as Schulrat Aschenbrenner
  (2004, TV miniseries), as Count Sagrato
  (2004, TV Movie), as Aldo Caldini
  (2004, TV Movie), as Duc d'Armagnac
 Donna Leon: Acqua Alta (2004, TV series episode), as Carmello La Capra
 Cowgirl (2004), as Hans Krahl
 The Piano Tuner of Earthquakes (2005), as Dr. Emmanuel Droz
  (2006, TV Movie), as Konrad von Wallenrod
 Flood (2007), as Arthur Moyes
  (2007, TV Movie), as Robert Kreutzer
  (2008, TV Movie), as Paolo Naldini
 John Rabe (2009), as Oskar Trautmann
 Flores negras (2009), as Curtis
  (2009, TV Movie), as King Gustav
 Aghet – Ein Völkermord (2010, docudrama, TV Movie), as General Kress von Kressenstein
  (2010), as Georg Maria Stahl
 Die Löwin (2012, TV Movie), as Jo
  (2013, TV Movie), as Dr. Jan Kersebohm
 Ruby Red (2013), as Dr. White (final film role)

Audiobooks 
 Gottfried John reads: Die toten Seelen by Nikolai Gogol. 2006, .
 Gottfried John reads: Die Stunden by Michael Cunningham. 2007, .

Written works 
 Bekenntnisse eines Unerzogenen, autobiography, publisher: Econ, Berlin 2000, .
 Das fünfte Wort, novel, publisher: Ullstein, Berlin 2003, .

Nominations and awards

 1982: Großer Hersfeld-Preis for his role as Jago in Othello
 1999: Bavarian Film Awards, Best Actor 
 2000: Bavarian Film Awards for Asterix & Obelix Take on Caesar (Bester Nebendarsteller)
 2004: Euregio Filmball – Best Euregio-Actor
 2006: DIVA-Award – European Award (Hall of Fame)
 2017: RF Hall of Fame

References

External links

 
Gottfried John at the German Dubbing Card Index

1942 births
2014 deaths
Deaths from cancer in Germany
Male actors from Berlin
German male film actors
German male television actors
20th-century German male actors
21st-century German male actors